Gonionota uberrima is a moth in the family Depressariidae. It was described by Edward Meyrick in 1914. It is found in Peru.

The wingspan is about 18 mm. The forewings are ferruginous with a deep yellow blotch occupying the basal two-fifths, except the costal third, its outer edge convex and extended to the costa as a slender streak, a light ferruginous line crosses this blotch at one-fourth of the wing, terminating in its dorsal angle. There is a short oblique white strigula on the costa at three-fourths. The hindwings are coppery fulvous.

References

Moths described in 1914
Gonionota